Landmark is a serviced office provider based in London. , it operates 40 serviced offices in nine different cities.

History
Landmark was established in February 2000 to provide serviced offices to corporate firms in central London. Initially focusing on City of London buildings, it expanded into the West End of London in 2013, an area reported by Jones Lang LaSalle to have limited high-end office space.

In January 2018, Landmark merged with office space provider i2 Office.

Landmark provides private offices, virtual offices, meeting rooms and Club Space membership, also known as coworking.

Buildings
Landmark currently provides office space in 40 buildings:
 3 Brindleyplace, B1
2 Snow Hill, B4
One Temple Quay, BS1
40 Bank Street, E14
200 Aldersgate, EC1
99 Bishopsgate, EC2
110 Bishopsgate, EC2
60 Gresham Street, EC2
125 Old Broad Street, EC2
6 Bevis Marks, EC3
54 Fenchurch Street, EC3
40 Gracechurch Street, EC3
Holland House, Bury Street, EC3
Royal Exchange, EC3
15 St Botolph Street, EC3
St Magnus House, EC3
Cannon Place, Cannon Street, EC4
75 King William Street, EC4
Exchange Place 2, EH3
2 West Regent Street, G2
No 1 Leeds, Whitehall Road, LS12
Chancery Place, Brown Street, M2
3 Hardman Square, M3
Luminous House, 300 South Row, MK9
The Pinnacle, Midsummer Boulevard, MK9
Euston House, Eversholt Street, NW1
450 Brook Drive, RG2
6 Mitre Passage, SE10
105 Victoria Street, SW1
120 New Cavendish Street, W1W
15 Alfred Place, WC1E
40 Bernard Street, Russell Square, WC1
33 Cavendish Square, W1
4 Devonshire Street, W1
48 Dover Street, W1
11-14 Grafton Street, W1
30 Newman Street, W1
Portman House, 2 Portman Street, W1
81 Chancery Lane, WC2

References

External links
Business Centre of the Month: Landmark’s 110 Bishopsgate, searchofficespace.com, 13 December 2013
Wimbledon 2012 Landmark Prize Winners
Telegraph 1000: Britain's Brightest Businesses

Companies based in the City of London